Okura may refer to:

 Okura Hotels, an international chain headquartered in Japan
 Okura River in New Zealand
 Okura, New Zealand, a village
 Ōkura school of traditional Japanese comic theater
 Okura, Yamagata, a village in Japan
 the Japanese word for okra
 Yamanoue no Okura, a Japanese poet